Salter-Battle Hunting and Fishing Lodge, also known as Portsmouth Hunting and Fishing Club, is a historic hunting lodge located on Sheep Island near Ocracoke, Carteret County, North Carolina. It was built about 1945, and is a simple one-story, side-gable, frame building set on concrete piers.  A gable-front, screened porch was added about 1948. Also on the property are a contributing cistern, storage shed, and cemetery with the graves of early settlers of the island (1810-1907).

It was listed on the National Register of Historic Places in 2005.

References

Houses on the National Register of Historic Places in North Carolina
Houses completed in 1945
Houses in Carteret County, North Carolina
National Register of Historic Places in Carteret County, North Carolina